Acragas longimanus is a species of jumping spider in the genus Acragas. It was first described in 1900 by Eugène Simon. These spiders are  found in Brazil.

References

External links 

longimanus
Spiders of Brazil
Spiders described in 1900